Tom Cowan (born 31 October 1942) is an Australian filmmaker.

Career
He started as a trainee at the Australian Broadcasting Commission and the joined the Commonwealth Film Unit. He left it in 1968 to work as a freelance cameraman and moved into feature films. His 1972 film The Office Picnic was entered into the 8th Moscow International Film Festival.

Select filmography

The Dancing Girls (1964) - documentary - DOP
Helena in Sydney (1967) - documentary - short
This Year Jerusalem (1969) - documentary - DOP, director
Samskara (1969) - DOP
Trouble in Molopolis (1970) - DOP
Mogador (1970) - DOP (film appears to never have screened publicly)
Australia Felix (1970) - short - director
Story of a House (1970) - educational short
Down Under (1971) - DOP
Bonjour Balwyn (1971) - DOP
The Office Picnic (1972) - director, writer, producer
Promised Woman (1975) - director, writer, DOP
Wild Wind (1975) - director
Pure S (1975) - DOP
The Love Letters from Teralba Road (1977) - DOP
Journey Among Women (1977) - director
Third Person Plural (1978) - DOP
 Mouth to Mouth (1978)
Dimboola (1979) - DOP
Sweet Dreamers (1981) - director
Winter of Our Dreams (1981) - DOP
Dead Easy (1982) - DOP
One Night Stand (1984) - DOP
Emma's War (1986) - DOP
Antarctica (1991) (documentary) - DOP
Backsliding (1992) - DOP
Africa's Elephant Kingdom (1998) (documentary) - DOP
Orange Love Story (2004) - director

Unmade films
Roche (1974) - proposed follow up to Promised Woman

References

External links

Tom Cowan at Melbourne Independent Filmmakers
Reema Moudgil, 'Tom Cowan: Moment Of Truth', Unboxed Writers, 28 July 2011
Tom Cowan's blog

1942 births
Living people
Australian film directors